Olga Beresnyeva (born 12 October 1985 in Zhdanov), is an Olympic and national-record holding distance swimmer for Ukraine. She also competed for Israel between 2004 and 2010, before returning to her native Ukraine.

Career
She has swum at the:
Olympics: 2000, 2004, 2012
World Championships: 2003, 2005, 2009, 2011, 2013
European Championships: 2010
Open Water Worlds: 2008, 2010

She swam for Ukraine at her first Olympic Games in 2000, at the age of 14; and at her second Olympics in 2004.

At the 2003 World Championships, she set the Ukraine Record in the 1500 free (16:27.76).

After the 2004 Olympics, she change sport nationality to Israel. After failing to qualify for the 2008 Olympics, Beresnyeva returned to Ukraine.

Originally a distance swimmer in the pool, she began swimming open water races in 2008. Beresnyeva won the 25K race at the 2010 European Championships, the first time she swam the race.

She swam in her third Olympics in 2012, swimming the Open Water event, but was disqualified and excluded from the Games by the IOC in June 2015 after re-analysis of a drug test showed she had been doping.

See also
List of Israeli records in swimming

References

1985 births
Living people
Sportspeople from Mariupol
Ukrainian emigrants to Israel
Olympic swimmers of Ukraine
Swimmers at the 2000 Summer Olympics
Swimmers at the 2004 Summer Olympics
Swimmers at the 2012 Summer Olympics
Female long-distance swimmers
Ukrainian female swimmers
Doping cases in swimming
Ukrainian sportspeople in doping cases
Universiade medalists in swimming
Universiade bronze medalists for Ukraine
Medalists at the 2003 Summer Universiade